Atheris rungweensis, commonly known as the Rungwe tree viper, Mt Rungwe bush viper, and Rungwe leaf viper, is a species of venomous viper found in East Africa.

Taxonomy
The specific name is derived from the species type locality in the Rungwe Mountains. It was formerly considered as a subspecies of Atheris nitschei.

Description
At midbody, it has 22–33 dorsal scale rows. The ventral scales number 150–165, and the subcaudals 46–58.

The color pattern is variable, with a ground color that ranges from bright green to green to black. Usually, this is overlaid with a pair of yellow dorsolateral zigzag lines. A row of yellow spots on the sides of the ventral scales may also be present. Specimens from the Sumbawanga region usually have a green yellow and black color pattern. Neonates are a dark brown or gray, but with a bright yellow tail tip.

Distribution and habitate
Atheris rungweensis is known from scattered locations from south-western Tanzania to north-eastern Zambia and south to the Nyika Plateau in northern Malawi.

Occasionally, it is encountered in moist savanna, woodland, and hill forest habitats.

References

Further reading
 Bogert CM. 1940. Herpetological Results of the Vernay Angola Expedition, with Notes on the African Reptiles in Other Collections. Part I. — Snakes, Including an Arrangement of African Colubridae. Bull. American Mus. Nat. Hist. 77: 1-107 + Plate I. ("Atheris nitschei rungweensis, new species", pp. 104–106, Figure 18).

rungweensis
Snakes of Africa
Reptiles of Malawi
Reptiles of Tanzania
Reptiles of Zambia
Taxa named by Charles Mitchill Bogert
Reptiles described in 1940